From 1973 to 1981, the starting infield of the Los Angeles Dodgers consisted of four players: Steve Garvey at first base, Davey Lopes at second, Ron Cey at third, and Bill Russell at shortstop. Beginning on June 13, 1973, against the Philadelphia Phillies, and lasting until Game 6 of the 1981 World Series (a period of eight and a half years), the quartet set a Major League Baseball record for the same four players designated as starters for those positions.

Background
On June 13, 1973, the quartet of players, Steve Garvey, Davey Lopes, Ron Cey and Bill Russell, played together for the first time as an infield, but after a game on June 23, against the Cincinnati Reds at Dodger Stadium, they played together for the rest of the 1973 season, then eight more. This longevity gave the quartet a Major League Baseball record for the same four players designated as starters for the four infield positions. The identification of the best infield in the history of major league baseball is a perennial topic of discussion. Most discussions focus on particular individual seasons, but the 1970s-era Dodgers players were the greatest as measured by their establishment of an objectively-measured accomplishment: The length of time they played together.

The head scout for the Dodgers, Al Campanis, is credited with bringing the players to the team. The group was put together by manager Walter Alston and assistant manager Tommy Lasorda and had been nurtured by coach Monty Basgall. Garvey was the first baseman, Lopes played second base, while Russell played shortstop and Cey was at third base. Three of the players came to the Dodgers playing at different positions than the ones where they ended up. Russell and Cey were both outfielders, while Garvey and Cey were both thirdbasemen. At the beginning of the 1973 season, none of the players had started playing at their eventual positions.

The four players had a total of 21 All-Star game appearances, four National League pennants and a World Series championship. Garvey was a four-time Gold Glove recipient, and Lopes received it once.

The last game the four players played together was the Dodgers' victory over the New York Yankees in Game 6 of the 1981 World Series at Yankee Stadium. The longevity of the group is attributed to each of the players playing at their peak, the winning record of the Dodgers, and the similarity in temperament and age of each of the men. According to writer Gary Kelin, "free agency and the sport's evolving financial structure make it improbable that any group will equal its longevity." They are still known among Dodger fans as "The Infield",  while W. R. Bill Schroeder, writing in the Baseball Research Journal in 1980, described them as the "Durable Dodger Infield".

Aftermath
Garvey left for the San Diego Padres on a contract of $6.6 million over five years in the winter of 1981. He helped prove a veteran presence for the Padres in four seasons with the team while also setting a record for most consecutive games played by a National League player in his first game back at Dodger Stadium. The streak lasted until 1983 at 1,207 games, which was third longest in MLB history at the time. Lopes was sent away by the Dodgers before the 1982 season started due to a trade to the Oakland Athletics that gave rookie Steve Sax the chance to start at second base. The same would happen for Cey, who traded by the Dodgers to the Chicago Cubs in 1983. Russell would end his career with the Dodgers in 1986, having played all seventeen years with the team, with his games played being second most in franchise history and most since the move to Los Angeles; he joined the team as a coach in 1994 before being hired to manage them in 1996, where he led them to one playoff appearance in three years.

References

Further reading

External links
  
 
 

Los Angeles Dodgers